The following lists events that happened in 1939 in Iceland.

Incumbents
Monarch - Kristján X
Prime Minister – Hermann Jónasson

Events
 Iceland in World War II

Births
 
21 February – Jón Baldvin Hannibalsson, politician and diplomat (d. 2017)
14 July – Rúnar Guðmannsson, footballer
27 September – Guðrún Kristín Magnúsdóttir, artist and writer
20 October– Kristín Halldórsdóttir, politician (d. 2016).
7 November – Eiður Svanberg Guðnason, politician.
29 October – Guðmundur G. Þórarinsson, politician.

Deaths

References

 
1930s in Iceland
Iceland
Iceland
Years of the 20th century in Iceland